Egalia's Daughters is a novel by Gerd Brantenberg that was first published in 1977 in Norwegian.  The novel is like most of Brantenberg's other works – norm-breaking in such a way that it questions the social, existential and erotic position of women in the society. The book has been translated into several languages and is considered a feminist literature classic.

The name of the former South Korean feminist community Megalia was based partly on the name of this book.

Content 
The story is located in the fictional land of Egalia, where the gender roles are topsy-turvy by completely switching the stereotypical gender roles. The protagonist of the novel is a young boy named Petronius. He is active in the fight against the current feminine norms in the society, wanting to reach an equal society and fulfill his dream of becoming a seawoman. Even though Petronius sometimes fantasizes about a quiet and peaceful life with a strong woman to take care of him, he continues his tough fight for a better future for men. In the novel a number of examples of the current matriarchy is shown as poor Petronius is being forced to use a “PH” (which is the male equivalent to a women's bra for the penis) and is also introduced to birth control pills for men.

The language in the novel is used to present how the words used in society today are based on the patriarchy by making the core of each word feminine, which is presented early in the book by the usage of “wim” and “menwim”. The nomenclature in the book is based on the Norwegian names where short and roughly sounding names are given to women (Ba, Gro and Rut) while men are given longer and more melodical names (Petronius, Mirabello and Baldrian). The word human is substituted by huwim, to point out the patriarchism the basic word to describe a human has in society today.

References 

1977 novels
Feminist novels
20th-century Norwegian novels